The 2003 NFL season was the 84th regular season of the National Football League (NFL).

Regular-season play was held from September 4, 2003, to December 28, 2003. Due to damage caused by the Cedar Fire, Qualcomm Stadium was used as an emergency shelter, and thus the Miami Dolphins–San Diego Chargers regular-season match on October 27 was instead played at Sun Devil Stadium, the home field of the Arizona Cardinals. This was the first season in NFL history where every team won at least 4 games. 

The playoffs began on January 3, 2004. The NFL title was won by the New England Patriots when they defeated the Carolina Panthers, in Super Bowl XXXVIII at Reliant Stadium in Houston, Texas, on February 1.

This was the last season until the 2016 NFL season where neither of the previous Super Bowl participants made the playoffs.

Draft
The 2003 NFL Draft was held from April 26 to 27, 2003 at New York City's Theater at Madison Square Garden. With the first pick, the Cincinnati Bengals selected quarterback Carson Palmer from the University of Southern California.

Referee changes
Dick Hantak and Bob McElwee retired in the 2003 off-season. Hantak joined the league as a back judge (the position title was changed to field judge in 1998) in 1978, and was assigned Super Bowl XVII in that position. He was promoted to referee in 1986, working Super Bowl XXVII. McElwee joined the NFL in 1976 as a line judge, and became a referee in 1980. He was the referee for three Super Bowls: XXII, XXVIII, and XXXIV. Walt Anderson and Pete Morelli were promoted to referee to replace Hantak and McElwee.

Major rule changes

 If an onside kick inside the final five minutes of the game does not go 10 yards, goes out of bounds, or is touched illegally, the receiving team will have the option of accepting the penalty and getting the ball immediately. Previously, the kicking team was penalized, but had another chance to kick again from five yards back.
 League officials encouraged networks to immediately cut to a commercial break if an instant replay challenge review was initiated. Previously networks were generally not permitted to utilize those game stoppages for their prescribed commercial periods.

2003 deaths
 John Butler: A former General Manager with the Buffalo Bills, whose team qualified for Super Bowl XXVIII and the San Diego Chargers, he died of lymphoma on April 11, 2003.
 David Woodley: Having played for the Miami Dolphins in Super Bowl XVII, Woodley died from complications due to kidney and liver failure on May 4, 2003. Twenty years after Super Bowl XVII, he became the youngest Super Bowl starting quarterback to die, until the death of Super Bowl XXXIV starter Steve McNair at age 36 in 2009. Woodley was buried at St. Joseph Cemetery in Shreveport, alongside his parents.

Pro Football Hall of Fame
 Sid Gillman: A former head coach and general manager with the San Diego Chargers, Gillman died in his sleep on January 3, 2003 at the age of 91. He was interred in the Hillside Memorial Park Cemetery in Culver City, California.

Final regular season standings

Tiebreakers
 Indianapolis finished ahead of Tennessee in the AFC South based on head-to-head sweep (2–0).
 Denver clinched the AFC 6 seed instead of Miami based on better conference record (9–3 to 7–5).
 Buffalo finished ahead of N.Y. Jets in the AFC East based on better division record (2–4 to 1–5).
 Jacksonville finished ahead of Houston in the AFC South based on better division record (2–4 to 1–5).
 Oakland finished ahead of San Diego in the AFC West based on better conference record (3–9 to 2–10).
 Philadelphia clinched the NFC 1 seed instead of St. Louis based on better conference record (9–3 to 8–4).
 Seattle clinched the NFC 5 seed instead of Dallas based on strength of victory (.406 to .388).

Playoffs

Bracket

Milestones
The following teams and players set all-time NFL records during the season:

Statistical leaders

Team

Individual

Awards

Coaching changes
 Cincinnati Bengals – Marvin Lewis; replaced Dick LeBeau who was fired following the 2002 season.
 Dallas Cowboys – Bill Parcells; replaced Dave Campo who was fired following the 2002 season.
 Detroit Lions – Steve Mariucci; replaced Marty Mornhinweg who was fired following the 2002 season.
 Jacksonville Jaguars – Jack Del Rio; replaced Tom Coughlin who was fired following the 2002 season.
 San Francisco 49ers – Dennis Erickson; replaced Steve Mariucci who was fired following the 2002 season.

Stadium changes

 Baltimore Ravens: Ravens Stadium was renamed M&T Bank Stadium after M&T Bank acquired the naming rights
 Chicago Bears: The Bears moved back to a newly renovated Soldier Field after temporarily playing in 2002 at Memorial Stadium in Champaign, Illinois
 New England Patriots: CMGI Field was renamed Gillette Stadium after Gillette acquires the naming rights
 Philadelphia Eagles: The Eagles moved from Veterans Stadium to Lincoln Financial Field, with Lincoln Financial Group acquiring the naming rights
 San Francisco 49ers: After the naming rights deal with 3Com expired, the stadium was officially renamed San Francisco Stadium at Candlestick Point instead of its original Candlestick Park name 

In addition new turf was installed for the following teams:
 Atlanta Falcons: New FieldTurf surface
 Buffalo Bills: New AstroPlay home turf
 New Orleans Saints: New AstroPlay home turf by mid-season
 New York Giants, New York Jets: New FieldTurf surface replacing natural grass.

New uniforms
 The Atlanta Falcons unveiled a new uniform design featuring red trim down the sides of both the jerseys and pants. The pants were switched from gray to white, and black pants were also introduced for selected games. Black remained the primary jersey color while a red alternate jersey was also introduced. The falcons helmet logo was redesigned to be more aggressive and closely resemble a capital "F".
 The Cincinnati Bengals added new alternate black pants with their black jerseys for select home games.
 The Cleveland Browns added new alternate orange pants last worn during the 1970s-early 1980s Kardiac Kids era of coach Sam Rutigliano.
 The Denver Broncos introduced blue pants with orange streaks to match with their blue jerseys.
 The Detroit Lions introduced a new design that added black trim to their logo and jerseys, and changed their face masks from blue to black.
 The Houston Texans added red third alternate uniforms.
 The Miami Dolphins added orange third alternate uniforms.
 The New England Patriots added silver third alternate uniforms.
 The New Orleans Saints wore gold pants full time, discontinuing using black pants with their white jerseys.
 The Philadelphia Eagles added silver trim to the jersey numbers on uniforms, and black third alternate uniforms.
 The San Diego Chargers wore white pants instead of blue with their white jerseys. They wore blue pants with their blue jerseys for the game vs. the Dolphins which had to be moved from San Diego to Arizona due to wildfires in southern California.
 The Tennessee Titans added powder blue third alternate uniforms.

Television
This was the sixth year under the league's eight-year broadcast contracts with ABC, CBS, Fox, and ESPN to televise Monday Night Football, the AFC package, the NFC package, and Sunday Night Football, respectively.

At Fox, Tony Siragusa joined Dick Stockton and Daryl Johnston on the network's #2 broadcast team in a sideline analyst role instead of the traditional sideline reporter.

Notes

References
 NFL Record and Fact Book
 NFL History 2001– (Last accessed October 17, 2005)
 Total Football: The Official Encyclopedia of the National Football League

External links
 Football Outsiders 2003 Team Efficiency Ratings
 Pro Football Reference.com – 2003

National Football League seasons
 
National Football League